South Wilts Grammar School, formerly South Wilts Grammar School for Girls, is a grammar school in Salisbury, south Wiltshire, England, for pupils aged 11 to 18. Established in 1927, the school converted to an academy in 2011. In 2020, the name was changed to South Wilts Grammar School to reflect the fact that male students would be accepted into sixth form as of September that year.

History
Opened in 1927 on a site about one mile north of the centre of Salisbury, the school was originally combined with Bishop Wordsworth's School. The two schools have close links.

South Wilts gained specialist status in mathematics and computing in 2003, and in 2010 the International School Award. It became an academy in January 2011.

In 2009, it was the top-achieving school in Salisbury, including independent schools. Entry is by a selective entrance examination known as the eleven-plus.

Since September 2020, the school admits boys to its sixth form.

Notable former pupils

 Anna Brecon, Emmerdale actress
 Carolyn Browne, Former Ambassador to Azerbaijan
 Sally Clark, British lawyer
 Helen Dawes, Anglican priest and academic
 Norvela Forster, MEP from 1979 to 1984 for Birmingham South
 Penny Tranter, BBC forecaster

Extra-curricular activities

The school has a Jazz Band, Wind Band, Orchestra, Guitar Group, Chamber string Group, Junior choir, Senior choir and A Cappella.

Each musical group takes part in the Autumn and Spring concerts, though the Senior choir and A Capella do not take part in the latter in order to prepare for the joint choral concert. In addition, A Cappella – an auditioned SATB choir – takes part in two evensongs each year as well as performing a major work near the February half-term.

The joint choral concert takes place in May, often in Salisbury Cathedral or Salisbury's City Hall, and is a performance by Senior Choir, A Capella, and the Bishop Wordsworth's Choir. There are performances by each individual group, and a few major works by the combined choir. In previous years this has included Haydn's 'Insanae et vanae curae', Handel’s 'Zadok the Priest' and a medley of songs from Les Miserables.

The school has notable student-driven involvement in Public Speaking and Debating , competing yearly in Oxford and Cambridge School’s Debating Competitions and consistently achieving success in the ESU Churchill Public Speaking Competition for KS4 pupils. For KS3 there is also rotary public speaking, a competition against grammar school Bishop Wordsworth’s Grammar School, an all male school.

The Design Technology department also offers V&A competition for the year 8s, and innovate for the year 10s.

Teacher misconduct cases
In 2015, Debbie Evans, who had been head of art at South Wilts until she resigned in 2013, was banned from teaching for life after being found guilty of unacceptable professional conduct for having a two-year affair with an ex-student.

In April 2018, computing teacher Ashley Bakewell admitted to taking inappropriate photos of female pupils at South Wilts without their knowledge, stating that he was particularly attracted to their long hair. He was banned from teaching indefinitely.

References

External links
 

Girls' schools in Wiltshire
Educational institutions established in 1927
Grammar schools in Wiltshire
Schools in Salisbury
1927 establishments in England
Academies in Wiltshire